Inga dominicensis is a species of plant in the family Fabaceae. It is found only in Dominica.

References

dominicensis
Flora of Dominica
Vulnerable plants
Taxonomy articles created by Polbot